Kilmarnock Infirmary was a general hospital in Kilmarnock, Ayrshire.

History
Kilmarnock Infirmary opened in 1868 in Portland Street, to meet the needs of the growing population in Kilmarnock. The original building was designed by the prolific Kilmarnock architect, William Atkinson Railton. The foundation stone was laid in September 1867 and the building opened in October 1868. A children's block and a nurses' training school were added in 1891. In 1923 it had a capacity of 130 beds.

After a new clock was completed in 1921, the original building became the nurses' home. After services transferred to Crosshouse Hospital, Kilmarnock Infirmary closed in 1982. The infirmary building and the accident and emergency building were demolished in the late 1980s. The listed nurses' home was demolished under a Dangerous Building Notice in September 1997.

Footnotes

Hospital buildings completed in 1868
Hospitals in East Ayrshire
Defunct hospitals in Scotland